Wanted is a 2016 South Korean television series starring Kim Ah-joong, Ji Hyun-woo, Uhm Tae-woong and Park Hae-joon. It aired on SBS on Wednesdays and Thursdays at 21:55 (KST) from June 22 to August 18, 2016 for 16 episodes.

Plot
Jung Hye-in (Kim Ah-joong) is a top actress in Korea who reigns over dramas, movies, and commercials. The drama begins when Jung Hye-in's son is kidnapped on the day she announces her retirement. With the help of PD Shin Dong-wook (Uhm Tae-woong) and police detective Cha Seung-in (Ji Hyun-woo), she ends up participating in a live reality show where she follows the kidnapper's orders, and in the process uncovers clues towards catching the culprit and finding her son.

Cast

Main cast
 Kim Ah-joong as Jung Hye-in – 35-year-old, actress
 Ji Hyun-woo as Cha Seung-in – 33-year-old, detective of Kangnam Police station's homicide investigation team
 Uhm Tae-woong as Shin Dong-wook – 38-year-old, "Jung Hye-in's Wanted" PD
 Park Hae-joon as Song Jeong-ho – 42-year-old, Hye-in's husband, UCN's CEO

Broadcast Production member
 Lee Moon-sik as Choi Joon-goo – 48-year-old, Head of UCN Drama Bureau, "Wanted" executive producer
 Park Hyo-joo as Yeon Woo-shin – 35-year-old, freelance broadcasting writer
 Jun Hyo-seong as Park Bo-yeon – 26-year-old, assistant director

Investigation team
 Shin Jae-ha as Lee Young-gwan – 27-year-old, Kangnam Police station's homicide investigation team newcomer, Seung-in's partner
 Kim Sun-young as Oh Mi-ok – 39-year-old, profiler, inspector of Police Hall's crime information support section
 Kim Byeong-ok as Jung Jung-ki – 54-year-old, Kangnam Police station's homicide investigation team leader
  as Park Young-sik – 38-year-old, detective of Kangnam Police station's homicide investigation team
  as Yoo Dong-joon – 31-year-old, detective of Kangnam Police station's homicide investigation team

People around Jung Hye-in
  as Kwon Kyung-hoon – 25-year-old, Hye-in's manager
 Lee Seung-joon as Jang Jin-woong – 36-year-old, internet entertainment show "Star Live" reporter
  as Ham Tae-seop – SG Group CEO, Tae-young's older brother
  as Song Hyun-woo – 7-year-old, Jeong-ho and Hye-in's son

Events and mission-related people
  as Park Se-hyung – Hyun-woo kidnap's suspect
 Shim Eun-woo as Lee Ji-eun – BJ
  as Kim Woo-jin – teacher, Han-sol's father (first mission)
 Kim Ye-jun as Kim Han-sol – child found in the car trunk (first mission)
  as Ha Dong-min – Soo Jeong Hospital's Head of Pediatrics (second mission)
  as Kim Sang-mi – Soo Jeong Hospital nurse (second mission)
 N/A as Kim Hae-joo – people who solicited the killing of Kim Sang-mi (second mission)
 Park Sang-wook as Jo Nam-cheol – old hand
 Choo Gyo-jin as Im Hyung-soon – people who was killed by Jo Nam-cheol
 Ahn Soo-bin as Kim Yang-hee – Jo Nam-cheol's girlfriend
 Seo Hyun-chul as Kim Sang-sik – Jo Seung-in's police senior
  as Na Soo-hyun – coffee shop's part-time staff
  as Go Hyung-joon – detective investigating the disappearance of Na Jae-hyun
  as Moon Sung-hyuk
  as Lee Yong-hwan – Lee Ji-eun's father
  as Lee Tae-gyun – Police Hall chief
  as Kim So-hyun – Song Jeong-ho's lady
 Baek Seung-hyeon as Choi Pil-gyu – lawyer
  as Ham Tae-young – Jung Hye-in's deceased husband, Hyun-woo's biological father

Extended cast
  as Kim Hong-joon – director of film "Mother" in which starred Jung Hye-in
  as Broadcasting PD – successor PD of the program directed by Shin Dong-wook
  as talk show "Kiss and Talk" PD
 Kim Sung-kyung as talk show "Kiss and Talk" MC
 Joo Woo-jae as talk show "Kiss and Talk" guest
 Hwang Young-hee as internet entertainment show "Star Live" editor-in-chief
 Yeo Woon-bok as debate program's police panelist
  as Cha Seung-in's father
 Shin Young-jin as autopsy responsibility
 Kang Chan-yang as nurse
  as Na Young-hyun – Na Soo-hyun's younger sister
 Oh Hee-joon as Pierrot
 Kim Min-sang as Kaepko
 Kang Heon as convenience store's customer
 
 
  as Police Hall deputy
  as Kim Sang-oh – Ham Tae-seop's lawyer
 Sung Min-soo as Kang Young-min – Internal Affairs Department's police officer
 
 Kim Ji-eun as Nurse

Ratings
In the table below, the blue numbers represent the lowest ratings and the red numbers represent the highest ratings.

Remark
Episode 15 and 16 wasn't aired on August 10 and 11 due to broadcast of the 2016 Summer Olympics in Rio de Janeiro, Brazil. This episode was re-scheduled to be aired on August 17 and 18, 2016.

Original soundtrack

OST Part 1

OST Part 2

OST Part 3

OST Part 4

International broadcast 
The series aired in Indonesia, Malaysia and Singapore with a variety of subtitles on ONE TV ASIA within 24 hours of the original South Korean broadcast. The drama is also available to stream in Singapore and Indonesia on Viu with English and Indonesian subtitles respectively.

In the United States, the drama airs in the Los Angeles DMA free, over-the-air on Asian American-oriented TV channel, LA 18 KSCI-TV (channel 18) with English subtitles from July 13 to September 1, 2016.

Awards and nominations

References

External links
 

Seoul Broadcasting System television dramas
2016 South Korean television series debuts
2016 South Korean television series endings
Korean-language television shows
South Korean crime television series
South Korean thriller television series